Samuel Almeida Costa (born 27 November 2000), sometimes known as Samú, is a Portuguese professional footballer who plays for Spanish club UD Almería as a central midfielder.

Club career
Born in Aveiro, Costa represented Beira-Mar, Gafanha, Palmeiras FC de Braga and Braga as a youth. He made his Campeonato de Portugal debut for the latter's B-team on 2 November 2019 in a game against Bragança.

On 25 July 2020, Costa played his first match for Braga, coming on as a substitute for Pedro Amador in the 46th minute in a match against Porto. On 10 September, he was loaned to Segunda División side UD Almería for the 2020–21 season.

International career
Costa was part of the Portugal team that finished runners-up to Spain at the 2019 UEFA European Under-19 Championship in Armenia.

References

External links

2000 births
Living people
People from Aveiro, Portugal
Portuguese footballers
Association football midfielders
Primeira Liga players
Campeonato de Portugal (league) players
S.C. Braga B players
S.C. Braga players
UD Almería players
Portugal youth international footballers
Portuguese expatriate footballers
Portuguese expatriate sportspeople in Spain
Expatriate footballers in Spain
G.D. Gafanha players
Sportspeople from Aveiro District